Etli ekmek is a dish which originated in Konya in Turkey (also known as Etli pide).“Etli ekmek” means "bread with meat" in Turkish. It is very common in cities in the central regions of Turkey. Etli ekmek can be bought at Turkish bakeries (bakery restaurants).

See also
 Pastrmalija
 Khachapuri
 Cantiq
 Lahmacun
 Pide

References

Macedonian cuisine
Turkish cuisine
Savoury pies
Tatar cuisine